Albert Charles Smith (1905 – unknown) was a Scottish footballer. His regular position was as a forward. He was born in Drumoyne.  He played for Petershill, Northampton Town, and Manchester United.

External links
MUFCInfo.com profile

1905 births
Scottish footballers
Manchester United F.C. players
Northampton Town F.C. players
Petershill F.C. players
Year of death missing
Association football forwards
Footballers from Glasgow
People from Govan
Scottish Junior Football Association players
English Football League players